Margaux Le Mouël (born 8 August 2001) is a French footballer who plays as a forward for Division 1 Féminine club Paris FC.

Club career
A native of Loudéac, Le Mouël began playing youth football with local side Loudéac OSC. A youth academy graduate of Guingamp, and after suffering a serious knee injury in late 2017, Le Mouël made her professional debut on 4 May 2019, coming on as a substitute for Ekaterina Tyryshkina in a 1–1 draw against Paris Saint-Germain.

On 30 June 2022, Le Mouël joined Paris FC on a three-year deal.

International career
Le Mouël is a French youth international and was part of the France under-19 squad which won 2019 UEFA Championship.

References

External links
 
 

2001 births
Living people
People from Pontivy
Women's association football forwards
Sportspeople from Morbihan
Footballers from Brittany
French women's footballers
France women's youth international footballers
Division 1 Féminine players
En Avant Guingamp (women) players
Paris FC (women) players